The 2019–20 SVGFF Premier Division was the eighth season of the SVGFF Premier Division, the top-tier football in Saint Vincent and the Grenadines under its current format, and it was also the 13th season of top flight football altogether. The season began on 24 November 2019, and was originally scheduled to end on 12 April 2020. Due to the COVID-19 pandemic, the season was suspended on 12 March 2020, and play did not resume until 11 August 2020, where the final six rounds were played through 6 September 2020.

Hope International won the league title, making it their fourth ever league title, and their first since 2015.

Many games take place at the 3,500-capacity Victoria Park (Kingstown).

Table

Stadiums

Notes

References 

2019-20
2019–20 in Caribbean football leagues
2019–20 in Saint Vincent and the Grenadines football
Saint Vincent and the Grenadines